Sigrid Agnes Maria Kaag (born 2 November 1961) is a Dutch diplomat and politician, serving as Minister of Finance and First Deputy Prime Minister in the Fourth Rutte cabinet. She previously served as Minister of Foreign Affairs from 25 May 2021 until 17 September 2021 and Minister for Foreign Trade and Development Cooperation from 26 October 2017 until 10 August 2021 in the Third Rutte cabinet.

A diplomat by occupation, Kaag worked as a civil servant for the Ministry of Foreign Affairs from 1990 until 1993 when she became a United Nations official for the UNRWA in Jerusalem from 1994 until 1997. Kaag worked as an administrator at the International Organization for Migration in Geneva from 1998 until 2004 when she became a senior advisor of the United Nations for Khartoum and Nairobi until 2005 when she became a senior official at UNICEF. Kaag served as Regional Director for Middle East and North Africa for UNICEF in Amman from 2007 until May 2010 when she was appointed Assistant Secretary-General and Director of the Bureau of External Relations of the UNDP in New York. She oversaw UNDP's strategic external engagement, organization-wide communication and advocacy, as well as resource mobilization.

From January 2015 until October 2017 she served as the United Nations Special Coordinator for Lebanon (UNSCOL). Prior to that she served as Under Secretary-General and Special Coordinator of the United Nations – Organisation for the Prohibition of Chemical Weapons (UN-OPCW) Joint Mission to eliminate the declared chemical weapons programme of the Syrian Arab Republic between October 2013 and September 2014. Until her mission in Syria she was employed as Assistant Secretary-General and Assistant Administrator and Director of the Bureau of External Relations and Advocacy of the United Nations Development Programme.

Early life and education
Kaag was born in Rijswijk as the daughter of a classical pianist. She grew up in Zeist and initially studied Arabic at Utrecht University, but later switched to The American University in Cairo where she obtained a B.A. degree in Middle East Studies in 1985. She subsequently obtained an M.Phil. degree in International Relations from St Antony's College (University of Oxford) in 1987 and an M.A. degree in Middle East Studies from the University of Exeter in 1988. She also received foreign relations training at the Clingendael Institute in The Hague, and studied at the French École nationale d'administration (ENA).

Career

Early career 
After her studies, Kaag worked as analyst for Royal Dutch Shell in London, United Kingdom. Later, she worked for the Dutch Ministry of Foreign Affairs as Deputy Head of the UN Political Affairs Department. During her time in the diplomatic service, she lived and worked in Beirut, Vienna, and Khartoum.

1994–2013: Career at the United Nations 
Kaag started working for the United Nations in 1994 and first served as Senior United Nations Adviser in the Office of the Deputy Special Representative of the Secretary-General in Khartoum, Sudan. From 1998 to 2004 she was Chief of Donor Relations for the International Organization for Migration and Senior Programme Manager with the External Relations Office of UNRWA in Jerusalem. Working in the Middle East she was responsible for areas as the occupied Palestinian territories, Lebanon, Jordan, and Syria.

From 2007 to May 2010, Kaag was Regional Director for Middle East and North Africa for UNICEF in Amman. In May 2010 she was appointed Assistant Secretary-General and Assistant Administrator and Director of the Bureau of External Relations and Advocacy of the United Nations Development Programme in New York. In this capacity, she was the deputy to Helen Clark and oversaw UNDP's  strategic external engagement, organization-wide communication and advocacy, as well as resource mobilization.

2013–2014: Head of the OPCW-UN Joint Mission in Syria 
On 13 October 2013, United Nations Secretary-General Ban Ki-moon nominated Kaag to lead the OPCW-UN Joint Mission for the destruction of Syria's chemical weapons. The United Nations Security Council was set to vote on her nomination three days later, on 16 October. She was then officially confirmed for the position. Kaag led a team of one hundred experts who were responsible for ensuring the elimination of Syria's chemical weapon stockpiles before 30 June 2014.

2014–2017: United Nations Special Coordinator for Lebanon 
By the end of her term in September 2014, news media reported that Kaag was rumored to succeed Lakhdar Brahimi as UN Special Envoy to Syria. On 1 December 2014, the UN Secretary General Ban announced that Kaag would become the United Nations Special Coordinator for Lebanon (UNSCOL), succeeding Sir Derek Plumbly.

In early 2017, Kaag was considered by international media to be one of the candidates to succeed Helen Clark as Administrator of the United Nations Development Programme and head of the United Nations Development Group; the post eventually went to Achim Steiner.

2017–present: Minister and party leader

In late October 2017, Kaag was called by D66 leader Alexander Pechtold and asked for a ministerial post.

Since 26 October 2017, Kaag had been serving as the Dutch Minister for Foreign Trade and Development Cooperation in the third government of Prime Minister Mark Rutte. After the resignation of Foreign Affairs Minister Halbe Zijlstra (VVD) on 13 February 2018, she was appointed ad interim to succeed him while conserving her other cabinet position. Sigrid Kaag was consequently the first female Minister of Foreign Affairs of the Netherlands. She was replaced by Stef Blok as Foreign Affairs Minister on 7 March 2018.

Since 2018, Kaag has been serving on the joint World Bank/WHO Global Preparedness Monitoring Board (GPMB), co-chaired by Elhadj As Sy and Gro Harlem Brundtland. In 2019, she joined the World Economic Forum High-Level Group on Humanitarian Investing, co-chaired by Børge Brende, Kristalina Georgieva and Peter Maurer.

Soon after joining the cabinet, there was speculation about Kaag's candidacy for the D66 list leadership, which had arisen after the resignation of Alexander Pechtold. During this period, she also profiled herself by giving speeches, often outside her own portfolio as a minister. 

On 21 June 2020, Kaag announced her candidacy for lijsttrekkerschap of the Democrats 66 party for the 2021 Dutch general election, with the ambition of becoming the Netherlands' first female Prime Minister. Kajsa Ollongren and Rob Jetten were also speculated to stand as candidates, but both refrained from doing so. The only opponent was therefore the unknown member Ton Visser, which resulted in Kaag winning the election with 95.7 percent of the votes. She was elected as Party Leader on 4 September 2020, making her the second female party leader of D66 after Els Borst in 1998. In this capacity, she led the party into the 2021 Dutch general election. In the run-up to the election, the VPRO documentary Sigrid Kaag: van Beiroet tot Binnenhof was broadcast on 3 January 2021. Before this, Kaag had been followed for several years by documentary makers. After the elections, GeenStijl published about the communication between the broadcasting company and D66 about the documentary, which they had obtained via a wob request. This showed that D66 did have a lot of substantive requests, some of which were granted, although this was denied beforehand. The Ministry of Foreign Affairs also interfered, including the broadcast date of the documentary. Initially, Kaag indicated that this was not at her request, but soon admitted that she was responsible for it. Following this report, the Dutch Media Authority (Commissariaat voor de Media) stated that there was no reason for further investigation, as editorial independence does not appear to have been violated. D66's campaign for the Lower House elections in March 2021 with Kaag was successful. They managed to grow by five seats to a total of 24 seats. This made them the second largest party, after the VVD. She joined the Lower House as parliamentary party chairman on 31 March 2021. During her HJ Schoo lecture in the Rode Hoed debating centre in September of the same year, she voiced fierce criticism of the political culture that had arisen partly under Rutte's leadership. Shortly after, in April 2021, she joined forces with Wopke Hoekstra in putting forward a motion of censure to voice their disapproval of VVD-leader Rutte.

Due to changes within the outgoing cabinet, Kaag was appointed Minister of Foreign Affairs on 25 May 2021. She combined this position with the ministry for Foreign Trade and Development Cooperation until 10 August 2021. Thereafter, she was succeeded as Minister for Foreign Trade and Development Cooperation by another former diplomat, Tom de Bruijn. On 16 September 2021, the House of Representatives passed a motion of censure against her. A majority reproached her for the late evacuation of Dutch citizens in Afghanistan and of persons in that country who had worked for the Netherlands. In response to the passing of the motion of censure, Kaag announced her intention to resign as minister. The King granted her resignation on 17 September, and she was succeeded by Ben Knapen.

After she negotiated in the 2021-2022 Dutch cabinet formation she returned to the Fourth Rutte cabinet as Minister of Finance.

Honours and awards
 2015 – Honorary LL.D. degree from the University of Exeter
 2016 – Wateler Peace Prize awarded by the Carnegie Foundation

Other activities

European Union organisations
 European Investment Bank (EIB), Ex-Officio Member of the Board of Governors (since 2022)
 European Stability Mechanism (ESM), Member of the Board of Governors (since 2022)

International organizations
 African Development Bank (AfDB), Ex-Officio Member of the Board of Governors (since 2017)
 Asian Development Bank (ADB), Ex-Officio Member of the Board of Governors (since 2017)
 Asian Infrastructure Investment Bank (AIIB), Ex-Officio Member of the Board of Governors (since 2022)
 European Bank for Reconstruction and Development (EBRD), Ex-Officio Alternate Member of the Board of Governors (since 2017)
 Inter-American Investment Corporation (IIC), Ex-Officio Member of the Board of Governors (since 2017)
 Joint World Bank-IMF Development Committee, Alternate Member
 Multilateral Investment Guarantee Agency (MIGA), World Bank Group, Ex-Officio Alternate Member of the Board of Governors (since 2017)
 World Bank, Ex-Officio Alternate Member of the Board of Governors (since 2017)
 OECD/UNDP Tax Inspectors Without Borders (TIWB), Member of the Governing Board (since 2017)

Non-profit organizations
 P4G – Partnering for Green Growth and the Global Goals 2030, Member of the Board of Directors (since 2019)
 Generation Unlimited, Member of the Board (since 2018)
 International Gender Champions (IGC), Member (since 2017)
 Global Commission on the Stability of Cyberspace (GCSC), Member (2017)

Personal life
Kaag is married and has four children. Her husband, Anis al-Qaq, is a dentist and a Palestinian national from Jerusalem who served as a deputy minister under Yasser Arafat in the 1990s and as the Palestinian representative to Switzerland. Kaag is a noted polyglot and speaks six languages: Dutch, English, French, Spanish, German and Arabic. She is a practicing Catholic. She was the first Special Representative of the UN Secretary-General.

References

External links

S.A.M. (Sigrid) Kaag MA, MPhil on Parlement.com 

|-

|-

|-

|-

|-

|-

1961 births
Living people
20th-century Dutch civil servants
20th-century Dutch diplomats
21st-century Dutch civil servants
21st-century Dutch diplomats
21st-century Dutch politicians
21st-century Dutch women politicians
Alumni of St Antony's College, Oxford
Alumni of the University of Exeter
Commissioners of the Global Commission on the Stability of Cyberspace
Democrats 66 politicians
Dutch expatriates in England
Dutch expatriates in Israel
Dutch expatriates in Lebanon
Dutch expatriates in Switzerland
Dutch expatriates in Syria
Dutch expatriates in the United States
Dutch nonprofit directors
Dutch officials of the United Nations
Dutch Roman Catholics
Dutch women diplomats
Female finance ministers
Female foreign ministers
Leaders of the Democrats 66
Members of the House of Representatives (Netherlands)
Ministers for Development Cooperation of the Netherlands
Ministers of Finance of the Netherlands
Ministers of Foreign Affairs of the Netherlands
People from Rijswijk
People from Zeist
The American University in Cairo alumni
UNICEF people
United Nations Development Programme officials
UNRWA officials
Women government ministers of the Netherlands